Lectures on Jurisprudence, also called Lectures on Justice, Police, Revenue and Arms (1763) is a collection of Adam Smith's lectures, comprising notes taken from his early lectures. It contains the formative ideas behind The Wealth of Nations.

Background
Published as part of the 1976 Glasgow Edition of the works and correspondence of Adam Smith.  It consists of two sets of lecture notes that were apparently taken from Smith's lectures of the 1760s, along with an 'Early Draft' of The Wealth of Nations. The same material had also appeared as An Early Draft of Part of The Wealth of Nations and as Lectures on Justice, Police, Revenue and Arms.

Summary
Smith’s Lectures on Jurisprudence, originally delivered at the University of Glasgow in 1762–1763, present his ‘theory of the rules by which civil government ought to be directed.’ The chief purpose of government, according to Smith, is to preserve justice; and ‘the object of justice is security from injury.’ The state must protect the individual’s right to his person, property, reputation, and social relations. Smith specifically defines the term jurisprudence as "the theory of general principles of law and government". It is also defined as the general guidelines about the essence of a nation's laws. Smith specifically defines the term jurisprudence as "the theory of general principles of law and government". It is also defined as the general guidelines about the essence of a nation's laws.

Part I: Of Justice
Division I. Of Public Jurisprudence
Division II. Domestic Law
Division III. Private Law

Part II: Of Police
The pros and cons of money, prices, and financial exchanges fall under this section of the Lectures "since the regulation of prices and the creation of money by the state both came under the head of police."

Division I. Cleanliness and Security
Division II. Cheapness or Plenty

Part III: Of Revenue

Part IV: Of Arms

Part V: Of the Laws of Nations

Scholarly critique 
According to William Caldwell, the lectures accomplish three goals: they detail Smith's philosophy and beliefs about economics, his motivation to write about the historical origins of political societies, and they show the influence of mercantilism and Francis Hutcheson on Smith's thoughts on the political economy. In an article for Political Science Quarterly, W. Hasbach opines that Smith believed that the political economy is the foundation for morality, law, government, wealth, revenue, and arms, a position that originated from the idea of natural law. He also notes that Smith's relationship with the Physiocrats is important in the Lectures and that some critics stated that he produced the same concepts as them on economics.  Hasbach also states that Smith expands on their ideas by saying that there needs to be a freedom of industry. Smith expects that industry and also commerce be laisser-faire and relevant to all aspects of political economics. Another scholar, C. F. Bastable, notes that Smith recognizes the need for industry for the production of wealth. Industry creates capital which is much needed in an economically viable society.

Hasbatch has also written that the Lectures offer a perspective of Smith's view on property that is different from that of  John Locke. Smith believes that property does not lie within the individual but rather it ought to be shared within society.  "The individual and his labor are in no respect the ultimate source of the right of property in land: the origin of this right is in society." Also, according to Hasbatch, Smith rejects a state of nature and the doctrine on an original contract, two ideas supported by Locke.

Notes

External links
Lectures on Justice, Police, Revenue and Arms on OLL
Lectures on Justice, Police, Revenue and Arms on archive.org

Books by Adam Smith
1976 non-fiction books
1896 non-fiction books
Books of lectures
Books about jurisprudence